The 1925 All-Eastern football team consists of American football players chosen by various selectors as the best players at each position among the Eastern colleges and universities during the 1925 college football season.

The undefeated 1925 Dartmouth Indians football team had four players who received first-team All-Eastern honors from at least one selector: halfback Andy Oberlander; end George Tully; tackle Nathan Parker; and guard Carl Diehl.

Five players received first-team All-Eastern honors and were also consensus first-team All-Americans: Oberander, Tully, and Diehl of Dartmouth; center Ed McMillan of Princeton; and tackle Ralph Chase of Pittsburgh.

Six of the All-Eastern honorees were later inducted into the College Football Hall of Fame: Oberlander; halfback Eddie Tryon of Colgate; fullback Andy Gustafson of Pittsburgh; end Vic Hanson of Syracuse; tackle Bud Sprague of Army; and guard Herbert Sturhahn of Yale.

All-Eastern selections

Quarterbacks
 Jim Foley, Syracuse (AP-1, CM)
 Earl "Zev" Graham, Fordham (NEB, HM)
 George Pease, Columbia (AP-2)
 Marion "Dolph" Cheek, Harvard (GD)

Halfbacks
 Andy Oberlander, Dartmouth (AP-1, CDD, NEB, GD [fb], HM, TJ, CM)
 Eddie Tryon, Colgate (AP-1, NEB, GD, HM, TJ, CM)
 Jackson Keefer, Brown (AP-2, CDD, GD)
 Tom Dignan, Princeton (CDD)
 Frank Kirkleski, Lafayette (AP-2)

Fullbacks
 Jacob Slagle, Princeton (AP-1, CDD [qb], TJ [qb])
 Bill Amos, Washington & Jefferson (AP-2, HM)
 Tony Plansky, Georgetown (TJ)
 Al Kreuz, Penn (AP-2, CM)
 Andy Gustafson, Pittsburgh (NEB)

Ends
 George Tully, Dartmouth (AP-1, NEB, HM, CM)
 Vic Hanson, Syracuse (AP-1, CM)
 Charles F. Born, Army (CDD, TJ)
 Korn, Swarthmore (GD)
 George Thayer, Penn (AP-2, GD)
 Ford, Lafayette (HM)
 Ray Wagner, Columbia (TJ)
 Edwards, Washington & Jefferson (NEB)
 Madison Sayles, Harvard (CDD)
 Henry Sage, Dartmouth (AP-2)

Tackles
 Nathan Parker, Dartmouth (AP-1, HM, TJ)
 Ralph Chase, Pittsburgh (AP-1, HM)
 Johnny Joss, Yale (AP-2, CDD, NEB, GD, CM)
 Kaleb Wiberg, Columbia (AP-2, GD)
 Caleb Frank Gates, Princeton (TJ)
 Bud Sprague, Army (AP-2, CM)
 Joseph Putnam Willson, Penn (NEB)
 Clement D. Coady, Harvard (CDD)

Guards
 Carl Diehl, Dartmouth (AP-1, CDD, GD, TJ, NEB)
 Herbert Sturhahn, Yale (AP-1,CDD, TJ)
 Emerson Carey, Cornell (AP-2, GD)
 Walter Mahan, West Virginia (AP-2, HM)
 Cothran, Lafayette (AP-2, HM)
 Zeke Wissinger, Pittsburgh (CM)
 Skubin, NYU (AP-2, CM)
 Bayard L. Kilgour Jr., Harvard (NEB)

Centers
 Ed McMillan, Princeton (AP-1, CDD, HM, TJ, CM, NEB)
 Karl Robinson, Penn (AP-2, GD)

Key
 AP = Associated Press, compiled based on opinions of 10 prominent coaches
 NEB = Norman E. Brown, sports writer and editor
 CDD = Charles Dudley Daly
 GB = Gil Dobie, head coach of Cornell
 HM = Herb McCracken, head coach of Lafayette
 TJ = Tad Jones, head coach of Yale
 CM = Chick Meehan, head coach of NYU

See also
 1925 College Football All-America Team
 1925 All-Western college football team

References

All-Eastern
All-Eastern college football teams